The women's 100 metre freestyle event at the 2018 Commonwealth Games was held on 8 and 9 April at the Gold Coast Aquatic Centre.

Records 
Prior to this competition, the existing world, Commonwealth and Games records were as follows:

The following records were established during the competition:

Results

Heats 
The heats were held on 8 April from 10:58 to 11:08.

Semifinals 
The semifinals were held on 8 April at 19:59 and 20:03.

Semifinal 1

Semifinal 2

Final 
The final was held on 9 April at 21:44.

References 

Women's 100 metre freestyle
Commonwealth Games
Common